Stigmella hisakoae is a moth of the family Nepticulidae. It was described by Sco Hirano in 2010. It is found in Japan (Honshū).

The larvae feed on Quercus serrata. They probably mine the leaves of their host.

References

Nepticulidae
Moths of Japan
Moths described in 2010